Terry O'Reilly (born July 7, 1959) is a Canadian broadcast producer and personality, best known as host of the CBC Radio One series O'Reilly on Advertising, The Age of Persuasion, and most recently Under the Influence - which alone has received nearly 30 million podcast downloads. These programs examine the cultural and sociological impact of advertising and marketing on modern life.

Early life 
O'Reilly was born in Sudbury, Northern Ontario to parents Mel and Betty O'Reilly with younger brother Michael O'Reilly.

Career 
Previously an advertising copywriter, O'Reilly, a graduate of Ryerson Polytechnical Institute, launched his own radio and television advertising production company, Pirate Radio and Television, in 1990. All three of his CBC Radio series and podcasts were independently produced for the network through Pirate until 2018, when O'Reilly began recording his program through his own Airstream mobile recording studio called "The Terstream."

With his Age of Persuasion co-producer Mike Tennant, he published the book The Age of Persuasion: How Marketing Ate Our Culture in 2009. In 2017, O'Reilly published his second book This I Know: Marketing Lessons from Under The Influence - a collection of marketing insights and tips to help small to medium-sized companies that can't afford a high-priced advertising agency. In 2018, it reached national best-seller status.

Personal life 
O'Reilly has been married to his wife Debbie since 1983 and has two daughters.

References

External links
Terry O'Reilly
The Age of Persuasion
Under The Influence

1959 births
Canadian media executives
Writers from Greater Sudbury
Toronto Metropolitan University alumni
Living people
CBC Radio hosts
Canadian non-fiction writers